Princess Alice and the Broken Arrow is the 14th studio album by the English rock band Magnum. The album was released by SPV in Germany on 23 March 2007, in the rest of Europe on 26 March 2007 and in the USA on 3 April 2007. The album title refers to the Princess Alice orphanage near Birmingham, with which Tony Clarkin has close personal ties. The album is the first new studio album with Rodney Matthews' artwork since 1992, and the only one to feature Jimmy Copley on drums.

The album entered the UK Album Charts at No. 70, the first time Magnum had charted in the UK since 1994. It also reached No. 4 on the BBC Rock Album Charts and No. 60 in Germany, the band's biggest market outside of the UK along with Scandinavia.

Track listing

Singles
Like Brothers We Stand digital (2008)
 "Like Brothers We Stand" [Radio edit] – 3:31
 "Your Lies" [LP version] – 4:32

Cover sleeve
The cover art was designed by Rodney Matthews.

"Tony had got this idea of Princess Alice in his head; the name came from the Princess Alice orphanage in Birmingham... although the Alice on the cover, our Princess Alice if you like, is a fictitious character. And it just seemed right to ask Rodney if he would be interested in doing a painting for the front cover instead of using computer graphics which we have used a lot in the recent past. Tony wanted the sly fox in the artwork and Princess Alice breaking the arrow over her head and this was something that had to be done by an artist... so the only man for the job was Rodney Matthews. We went down to his house in Wales and Tony sat down with him and went through his ideas for the cover and Rodney came back to us with this wonderful pencil drawing which knocked us over; it was brilliant in black and white so we knew it would look amazing in colour. Of course with Rodney he was a known quantity for us from Storyteller's Night and those other great covers and so he was the obvious choice. It reminds me a lot of Storyteller's Night and it shouts Magnum at you; I don’t think anybody else would have a cover like that really." — Bob Catley, 2007

"The little story there is that Princess Alice is doing a deal with the fox; breaking an arrow over her head is her making peace with the fox which is part of the lyrics in "Like Brothers We Stand". And this song is to do with the Native American Indians making peace with the White Man so that they ended up being shoved into reservations instead of having all of that country to themselves. "The Flood" from Sleepwalking was basically the same subject matter. And then the kids in the background stuck in the cages are all looking sorry for themselves and the Princess is trying to get the kids back as part of her deal. And she also kicked off a song called "You’ll Never Sleep" which closes the album that was also part of the very loose Princess Alice concept." — Bob Catley, 2007

"Princess Alice is a fictional character. Her name came from an orphanage in Birmingham, called the Princess Alice Orphanage. It was in Harborne, in Birmingham, many years ago; it's not there anymore. Tony was researching this before we started putting anything down for the album. He wanted to get his facts right, for personal reasons. And the name, Princess Alice kept going around his head, and it helped him put ideas for a song called "You'll Never Sleep", which is the last track on the album. So that kicked off the whole writing process, really. And the fox... Tony always wanted to get the evil sly fox into the artwork somewhere, and now he's got his chance. There's a little story on the front basically, how she is breaking an arrow over her head, which is a peace symbol, obviously. She's trying to do a deal with the fox, to get the little children back, that he has kidnapped and put them in cages in the back; you can see them and they’re very forlorn and sad." — Bob Catley, 2007

"Rodney came to the studio and let himself be inspired by us and the album title. He started with some small sketches, eventually producing this beautiful painting." — Bob Catley, 2007

Personnel
Tony Clarkin – guitar
Bob Catley – vocals
Al Barrow – bass guitar
Mark Stanway – keyboards
Jimmy Copley – drums

Additional musicians
Jim Lea — violin (on "You'll Never Sleep")

Production
Produced and written by Tony Clarkin
Mixed by Tony Clarkin & Mark V. Stuart
Recorded at M2, Mad Hat Studio by Mark V. Stuart
Assisted by Sheena Sear
Mastered by Ian Cooper at Metropolis, London
Cover artwork by Rodney Matthews
Other artwork by Al Barrow, Generic Designs
Publishing – Colin Newman at Maxwood Music Ltd

Princess Alice and the Broken Arrow tour
4 May – Lagerhalle, Osnabrueck
5 May – Columbia Club, Berlin
7 May – Spectrum, Augsburg
8 May – Z7, Pratteln
10 May – Colos-saal, Aschaffenburg
11 May – Capitol, Hanover
12 May – Zeche, Bochum
13 May – Kantine, Köln
14 May – Biebob, Vosselaar
15 May – Le Trabendo, Paris
17 May – Garage, Glasgow
18 May – Carling Academy, Newcastle
19 May – Rock City, Nottingham
20 May – The Academy, Bristol
22 May – The Waterfront, Norwich
23 May – The Academy 2, Manchester
24 May – Wulfrun Hall, Wolverhampton
25 May – Rio's, Leeds
26 May – Mean Fiddler, London

References

External links
 www.magnumonline.co.uk — Official Magnum site
 Record Covers — at rodneymatthews.com

2007 albums
Magnum (band) albums
Albums produced by Tony Clarkin
SPV/Steamhammer albums
Albums with cover art by Rodney Matthews